Knights of Pen & Paper 2, stylized as Knights of Pen & Paper II, is a role-playing video game developed by Kyy Games and published by Paradox Interactive. It was released on May 13, 2015, for iOS and Android, and on October 20, 2015, for Windows, OS X and Linux through the download service Steam. Versions for PlayStation 4, Nintendo Switch, and Xbox One were released in December 2018 under the name Knights of Pen & Paper 2: Deluxiest Edition. It is the sequel to Knights of Pen & Paper.

The game received mixed reviews from critics, who praised the art and overall improvements to the gameplay and story, but criticized it for being overly similar to the first game in the series, using the same music, and being shorter and easier than that entry.

Gameplay 
The gameplay of Knights of Pen & Paper 2 is similar to the first game in the series. It is a turn-based RPG in which the player controls a group of role-playing game players during a Dungeons & Dragons-style game session, as well as their Dungeon Master. The gameplay was streamlined from the first game, requiring less grinding, but is also less difficult overall.

Development 
The studio Kyy Games took over from the original developers, Behold Studios, due to the latter being too busy developing Chroma Squad.

Reception 

The game received "average" reviews on all platforms according to the review aggregation website Metacritic. Sam Wachter of RPGamer called the PC version more accessible than the original, with improved gameplay, and praised the 16-bit style graphics. Wachter criticized the amount that was recycled from the first game. Shaun Musgrave of TouchArcade said that the iOS version "feels less complete than its predecessor", and criticized it for being shorter and easier, despite complementing its improved presentation and better spelling and grammar in story sections.

References

External links 
 
 

2015 video games
Android (operating system) games
Digital tabletop role-playing games
Indie video games
IOS games
Linux games
MacOS games
Nintendo Switch games
Paradox Interactive games
PlayStation 4 games
Single-player video games
Video games developed in Finland
Windows games
Xbox One games